Stagden Cross is a hamlet in the civil parish of High Easter, and the Uttlesford district of Essex, England.

Rolfes Farmhouse in Stagden Cross is a Grade II listed timber framed and plastered farmhouse, formerly a one-story hall, dating to the 14th century. Stagden Cross Farmhouse is a timber framed and plastered Grade II former farmhouse dating to the 16th century; to the south of the farmhouse is the Grade II listed timber framed and black weatherboarded barn also dating to the 16th century.

References

External links 
 

Hamlets in Essex
Uttlesford